Robert H. Christenson, PhD, DABCC, FACB, is the current President of the American Association for Clinical Chemistry, AACC.   He is currently professor of pathology and professor of medical and research technology at the University of Maryland School of Medicine in Baltimore. He is a member of the editorial boards of Clinical Chemistry and the Journal of Clinical and Laboratory Analysis, and associate editor of Clinical Biochemistry.

References

21st-century American chemists
Living people
Year of birth missing (living people)